Peninsula is a neighborhood in Long Beach, California. It separates Alamitos Bay from the Pacific Ocean. It is adjacent to Belmont Shore and across the water from Naples.

History

The first homes were built between 1902 and 1904.

The Pacific Electric Long Beach-Alamitos Bay-Seal Beach Line ran along the Peninsula and across a trestle to Seal Beach, where it connected with the Balboa Line. This track was abandoned in 1940.

Sand is moved from the beach near the Belmont Veterans Memorial Pier to the Peninsula to replenish what is carried away by the prevailing currents.

Architecture

Gallery

See also
Neighborhoods of Long Beach, California
Alamitos Bay Yacht Club

References

Geography of Long Beach, California
Peninsula